Newtonville is a dispersed rural community in the Municipality of Clarington, Durham Region, Ontario, Canada.

Newtonville is the most easterly community in Clarington (and in Durham Region), and therefore forms the eastern end of the Greater Toronto Area. The community was formerly part of the southeastern part of the township of Clarke until 1973.

History
Newtonville's first Post office opened in 1835 when the village was known as both "Clarke" (named after Clarke Township, which it was part of) and "Newton".

Demographics 

References

Neighbourhoods in Clarington
Designated places in Ontario